Nasturtiopsis is a genus of flowering plants belonging to the family Brassicaceae.

Its native range is the Southern and Eastern Mediterranean.

Species
Species:

Nasturtiopsis coronopifolia 
Nasturtiopsis integrifolia

References

Brassicaceae
Brassicaceae genera